ATP-binding cassette sub-family B member 8, mitochondrial is a protein that in humans is encoded by the ABCB8 gene.

The membrane-associated protein encoded by this gene is a member of the superfamily of ATP-binding cassette (ABC) transporters.  ABC proteins transport various molecules across extra- and intra-cellular membranes.  ABC genes are divided into seven distinct subfamilies (ABC1, MDR/TAP, MRP, ALD, OABP, GCN20, White).  This protein is a member of the MDR/TAP subfamily.  Members of the MDR/TAP subfamily are involved in multidrug resistance as well as antigen presentation.  The function of this half-transporter has not yet been determined; however, it may involve the compartmentalization and transport of heme, as well as peptides, from the mitochondria to the nucleus and cytosol.  This protein may also play a role in the transport of phospholipids into mitochondrial membranes.

See also
 ATP-binding cassette transporter

References

Further reading

External links 
  
 

ATP-binding cassette transporters